Karlheinz Bux (born 1952 in Ulm, West Germany) is a German artist concentrating on drawing and sculpture works.

Career
The central pictorial theme of Karlheinz Bux's artistic practice is the line. Clarity, complexity and emblematic quality define his sculptures and mural reliefs which are made out of steel, bronze and wood. 
His drawings are executed on transparent materials such as glass and polymer foils, with photographic templates constituting the basis of his glass and foil works, that are altered by superimposition and linear treatment. Thereby, a multi-layered image reality is created, that allows numerous interpretations from the viewer, with the exploration of the peripheral areas of reality being central to his artistic practice.

Karlheinz Bux started his artistic career at State Academy of Fine Arts Karlsruhe (1972–1977). Various scholarships brought him to Paris (1986/87 and 1992) and Basel (2004/05). He created art-in-architecture projects among others in the cities of Radolfzell (1995, mural relief, steel 780/110/5 cm) and in Karlsruhe (2005, Lineamento Verticale, steel sculpture, 18m height). At the invitation of Center for Art and Media Karlsruhe, he and the artist Michaela Kölmel produced a room installation dedicated to the topic of light (Multimediale 2, 1991).
As visiting professor, Karlheinz Bux taught drawing at the University of Pforzheim (1994–95) and principles of design at University of Mainz (2007–08). His works can be found in many notable European museums and private collections, among others at Kunsthalle Karlsruhe and the Würth Collection.

Works

Solo exhibitions
2018 -  Linie, Galerie Rottloff Karlsruhe
2018 -  FUX, Luis Leu Karlsruhe (w. Sabine Funke)
2018 -  über Linie…, Städtische Galerie Tuttlingen
2017 -  Museum für aktuelle Kunst - Sammlung Hurrle Durbach (w. R.Nepita)
2016 -  Tiefe Gründe, Galerie Rottloff Karlsruhe
2014 - Schläfer, Galerie Rottloff Karlsruhe
2010 - Der Radar des Zeichners, Kunstverein Rastatt
2005 - Ississippi, Fondation Bartels Basel
1992 - Gesellschaft der Freunde junger Kunst, Baden-Baden 
1985 -  studio f, Ulm
1984 - Institut Unzeit, Berlin
1978 - Ulmer Museum (Studio), Ulm 
1977 - Werkstatt Galerie, Vienna

Group exhibitions
2019 - die erde und ihre schraffur im prioritätenstreit, Kunstverein Pforzheim
2018 - Vertikal, GKG Bonn
2011 - Waldeslust, Kunsthalle Würth Schwäbisch Hall
2008 - Modelle – Materialisierung von Konzepten, Deutscher Künstlerbund Berlin
2004 - Kunst seit 1960, Staatliche Kunsthalle Karlsruhe
2001 - Retour de Paris, Schloss Solitude Stuttgart
1996 - Zeichnen, Germanisches Nationalmuseum Nürnberg
1993 - Kunst der Neunziger Jahre, Badischer Kunstverein Karlsruhe
1991 - MultiMediale 2, ZKM Karlsruhe
1987 - Divergences-Convergences, Goethe Institute Paris und Lyon

Publications
Künstlerbund Baden-Württemberg (ed.), Was bleibt, Freiburg, 2015
Kei Müller-Jensen, Schläfer, Galerie Rottloff, Karlsruhe, 2014
Fondation Bartels (ed.), Der Fluss unbekümmert, Basel, 2014
Kunsthalle Würth (ed.), Waldeslust, Schwäbisch Hall, 2011
Michael Hübl, Der Radar des Zeichners, Karlsruhe, 2011
Karlheinz Bux (ed.), Lineamento Verticale, Karlsruhe, 2006
Fondation Bartels (ed.), Ississippi – Baselzeichnungen, Basel, 2005
Staatliche Kunsthalle (ed.), Kunst seit 1960, Karlsruhe, 2004
Dirk Teuber, Werke im öffentlichen Raum, Karlsruhe, 1996
Dirk Teuber, Skulptur-Zeichnung, Galerie Rottloff, Karlsruhe, 1995
Nike Bätzner, Gesellschaft der Freunde junger Kunst, Baden-Baden, 1992
Michael Hübl, Rauminstallation/Waschstände, MultiMediale 2, Karlsruhe, 1992
ZKM (ed.), MultiMediale 2, Karlsruhe, 1991
Goethe Institut (ed.), Divergences-Convergences, Paris, 1986
Thomas Wulffen, Kunstforum International, Band 77/78, 1985

References

External links
Official Website
http://www.kuenstlerbund-bawue.de/kuenstler/portrait/bux.html
http://www.kuenstlerbund.de/kab/index.php?viewid=269
http://www.discogs.com/artist/2607709-Karlheinz-Bux

German sculptors
German male sculptors
1952 births
Living people